Alfred Hassler (1910–1991) was an anti-war author and activist during World War II and the Vietnam War. He worked with the U.S. branch of the Fellowship of Reconciliation (FOR USA), a peace and social justice organization, from 1942 to 1974.

Early life and education
Hassler was born in Allentown, Pennsylvania in 1910. He grew up in New York and was educated at Brooklyn Polytechnic Institute in Brooklyn. He studied night classes in journalism at Columbia University.

Career
Hassler worked as a journalist at The Leader-Observer in Queens and then American Baptist Publications in Philadelphia. In 1942, Hassler became the editor of a pacifist journal called Fellowship published by FOR USA. He was imprisoned for his stance as a conscientious objector during World War II. While imprisoned, he wrote a book, Diary of a Self-Made Convict. He authored several anti-war books and articles and co-authored the 1957 advocacy comic book Martin Luther King and the Montgomery Story, published by FOR USA.

In 1958, Hassler became executive secretary of FOR USA. Hassler led FOR USA delegations to Vietnam in 1965 and 1967, which led to his collaboration and friendship of Thích Nhất Hạnh. In 1969, Hassler founded the Dai Dong Project, which linked war, environmental issues and poverty, and he became the president of the International Confederation for Disarmament and Peace. In his 1970 book Saigon, U.S.A., Hassler supported the Vietnamese Buddhists, arguing they could form a nonviolent "Third Force" for peace independent of both the Saigon and Hanoi governments.

Hassler retired from his position with FOR USA in 1974, and with his wife Dorothy founded a retirement community in southern Spain, Almeria. In the 1980s, he returned to New York.

Death
Hassler died of cancer on June 5, 1991, at Good Samaritan Hospital in Suffern, New York, at the age of 81.

In popular culture 
In 2013, Hassler, along with Thich Nhat Hanh and Sister Chan Khong, became the subject of a comic book and animated feature documentary film entitled The Secret of The 5 Powers.

References 

1910 births
1991 deaths
Activists from Allentown, Pennsylvania
Writers from Allentown, Pennsylvania
American conscientious objectors
Journalists from Pennsylvania